Dichlorofluoromethane or Freon 21 or R 21 is a halomethane or hydrochlorofluorocarbon with the formula CHCl2F. It is a colorless and odorless gas.  It is produced by fluorination of chloroform using a catalyst such as antimony trifluoride:
CHCl3 + HF → CHCl2F + HCl

Uses
Dichlorofluoromethane was used as a propellant and refrigerant.  Due to its role in ozone depletion, dichlorofluoromethane has been largely phased out. It has ozone depletion potential 0.04. Production and consumption has been since 2004 reduced to 15% of level from 1989 and it is to be phased out in 2015 according to Montreal Protocol.

Pyrolysis of a mixture of dichlorofluoromethane and chlorofluoromethane gives hexafluorobenzene:
3 CHCl2F + 3 CH2ClF → C6F6 + 9 HCl

Additional physical data
Its critical point is at 178.5 °C (451.7K) and 5.17MPa (51.7bar). At temperatures from 5K to 105K, it has one phase in the space group Pbca.

Safety
Its toxicity is comparable to that of chloroform.  Its TLV is 10ppm.

References

External links
 
 
 Termochemistry data at chemnet.ru
 Entry at Air Gas Liquide Encyclopaedia 

Hydrochlorofluorocarbons
Halomethanes
Refrigerants
Propellants